Avatar is a lost Italian silent film from 1916 based on the 1856 novel Avatar by Théophile Gautier. It was directed by Carmine Gallone and starred Soava Gallone. In the UK it was also known as The Magician. It was produced by Società Italiana Cines.

Cast
Soava Gallone
Andrea Habay
Augusto Mastripietri
Amleto Novelli

References

External links

1916 films
1916 drama films
Italian silent feature films
Italian black-and-white films
Films directed by Carmine Gallone
Lost Italian films
Italian drama films
1916 lost films
Lost drama films
Films based on works by Théophile Gautier
Silent drama films